Tachina vicina is a species of fly in the genus Tachina of the family Tachinidae that is endemic to France.

References

Insects described in 1830
Diptera of Europe
Endemic insects of Metropolitan France
vicina